The Lang ministry (1925–1927) or First Lang ministry was the 42nd ministry of the New South Wales Government, and was led by the 23rd Premier, Jack Lang. This ministry was the first of three ministries under Lang as Premier.

Lang was first elected to the New South Wales Legislative Assembly in 1913 and served continuously until 1946. In 1923 Lang was elected NSW Parliamentary Leader of the Labor Party by the Labor caucus, and became Opposition Leader in 1923. At the 1925 state election, Lang led Labor to victory, defeating the Nationalist Party led by Sir George Fuller.

The ministry covers the period from 17 June 1925 until 26 May 1927 when Lang was confronted with extended cabinet strife, centred on Albert Willis. Lang gained the approval of the Governor to reconstruct the ministry subject to an early election, held in October 1927.

Composition of ministry
The composition of the ministry was announced by Premier Lang on 17 June 1925 and covers the period up to 26 May 1927.

 
Ministers are members of the Legislative Assembly unless otherwise noted.

See also

Second Lang ministry
Third Lang ministry
Members of the New South Wales Legislative Assembly, 1925-1927
Members of the New South Wales Legislative Council, 1925-1927

References

 

New South Wales ministries
1925 establishments in Australia
1927 disestablishments in Australia
Australian Labor Party ministries in New South Wales